Lorang is an Austronesian language of the Aru Islands in eastern Indonesia. It is spoken in one village on Koba Island.

References

Aru languages
Languages of Indonesia